Panesthia lata, the Lord Howe Island wood-feeding cockroach or Lord Howe Island cockroach, is a large, wingless cockroach species endemic to the Lord Howe Island Group in the Tasman Sea.

Appearance and diet 
It is metallic in colour, with general black to reddish colouration. It can be distinguished from other related species by its shape and the markings on its thorax.

The species feeds on rotting wood and leaf litter, and has micro-organisms in its digestive system to help break down cellulose.  It stays in the ground during the day and feeds at night.

Population 
While once widespread across the archipelago, it was removed from Lord Howe Island proper by rats introduced in 1918, and none have been found for over 60 years. Today, the only known populations occur on nearby islets, including Blackburn Island, Roach Island and Ball's Pyramid. The species is classified as "Endangered" under the New South Wales Threatened Species Act, and a plan exists to eventually reintroduce a population to Lord Howe Island.

Taxonomy 
Panesthia lata was first described in 1868 by Francis Walker in his "Catalogue of the specimens of Blattariæ in the collection of the British Museum". It is in the subfamily Panestheiinae, which is distributed across Southeastern Asia and Oceania.

Rediscovery on Lord Howe island 
After not having been observed on Lord Howe Island for over 80 years, a biology student at the University of Sydney rediscovered them on the island in late 2022.

References 

Cockroaches
Insects of Australia
Insects of Lord Howe Island
Endangered insects
Insects described in 1868